Stanisław Kętrzyński (10 September 1878 in Lwów, Austro-Hungary – 26 May 1950 in Warsaw, Poland) was a Polish historian, diplomat and freemason.

He was the son of Polish historian Wojciech Kętrzyński.

During the Second World War Stanisław Kętrzyński was a prisoner in the German Auschwitz concentration camp.

Among his students were Stanisław Arnold, Aleksander Gieysztor, Jadwiga Karwasińska and Adam Wolff.

Works
 Gall-Anonim i jego kronika (1898)
 O rzekomej wyprawie Władysława Hermana na Szczecin (1899)
 O paliuszu biskupów polskich XI wieku (1902)
 O zaginionym żywocie św. Wojciecha (1902)
 Ze studiów nad Gerwazym z Tilbury (1903)
 O Astryku Anastazym (1906)
 Uwagi i przyczynki nad kancelaryą koronną Kazimierza Jagiellończyka (1912)
 O datach tzw. niejednolitych w dokumentach polskich (1927)
 Do genezy kanclerstwa koronnego (1929)
 Uwagi o pieczęciach Władysława Łokietka i Kazimierza Wielkiego (1929)
 Na marginesie "Genealogii Piastów" O. Balzera (1931)
 Zarys nauki o dokumencie polskim wieków średnich (1934)
 Ze studiów genealogicznych (1934)
 O zaginionej metropolii czasów Bolesława Chrobrego (1947)
 Polska X-XI wieku (1961, editor Aleksander Gieysztor)

Footnotes 

1878 births
1950 deaths
Ambassadors of Poland to Russia
20th-century Polish historians
Polish male non-fiction writers
Diplomats of the Second Polish Republic
Polish people of German descent
Auschwitz concentration camp survivors
Writers from Lviv
Diplomats from Lviv